Villanueva de los Infantes is a municipality in the province of Ciudad Real, Castilla–La Mancha, Spain. It has a population of 5727 people.

It is the capital of the comarca (region) Campo de Montiel. It has been designated by the Universidad Complutense de Madrid as "El Lugar de La Mancha" (The Place in La Mancha) mentioned at the start of Don Quixote by Miguel de Cervantes. It is also known as the place where Francisco de Quevedo died; his remains were found in 2007 in the church of San Andrés Apostol (St. Andrew's Church). It is possible to visit the room in the convent where Quevedo spent his final days. The convent is now the church of Santo Domingo (Saint Dominic) and this room is situated inside it.

It is also the town where Thomas of Villanova grew up.

The economy is based on tourism, wine and olives.

The town should not be confused with another Villanueva de los Infantes, in the province of Valladolid, which is part of the Castile and León autonomous community.

The patron saint of Villanueva de Los Infantes is Our Lady the Virgin of La Antigua, a 13th-century carving known in the Middle Ages as Santa María de Jamila. It was crowned canonically on the last Saturday of May 2000, by the Prior Bishop of Ciudad Real, Rafael Torija de la Fuente. His feast day is celebrated on September 8, coinciding with the Nativity of Our Lady. The patron saint is Santo Tomás de Villanueva, whose feast is celebrated on September 18, with pontifical privilege (the feast of Santo Tomás de Villanueva is celebrated on October 10).

References

Municipalities in the Province of Ciudad Real
Miguel de Cervantes